Tindallia texcoconensis is a Gram-positive, non-spore-forming, moderately halophilic, strictly anaerobic, alkaliphilic and motile bacterium from the genus of Tindallia which has been isolated from groundwater from the lake Texcoco in Mexico.

References

Clostridiaceae
Bacteria described in 2009
Bacillota